Oligopeptidase A (68000-M signalpeptide hydrolase) is an enzyme. This enzyme catalyses the following chemical reaction

 Hydrolysis of oligopeptides, with broad specificity. Gly or Ala commonly occur as P1 or P1' residues, but more distant residues are also important, as is shown by the fact that Z-Gly-Pro-Gly-Gly-Pro-Ala is cleaved, but not Z-(Gly)5

This enzyme is known from Escherichia coli and Salmonella typhimurium.

References

External links 
 

EC 3.4.24